The Sony CLIÉ PEG-SJ22 was a Palm OS based handheld "Personal Entertainment Organizer" released by Sony in 2003, it is a very similar device to the Sony CLIÉ PEG-SJ30 with a slightly different software package.

It was released to be the entry-level model and only ran Palm OS 4.1, not the newly released 5. It is in effect a Personal digital assistant with a few multimedia features. Sony Bundled the Kinoma Video Player with the device, although out of the box it only had sound output in the form of a Piezo-buzzer. This resulted in very poor sound quality without the optional Stereo Audio Adapter. Also bundled were the Sony PG Pocket application, which allowed the retrieval of images from Memory Stick media or the optional Memory Stick camera and the Photostand application, which allowed use of the CLIÉ as a Digital photo frame.

Other notable mentions are WA Clock, a world clock application which takes full advantage of the CLIÉ's high resolution display, and CLIÉ Paint, which is a simple paint application able to create or edit pictures stored on the device (including those in PG Pocket).

Due to the CLIÉ having a High-resolution display, Sony included a new technology to Palm OS 4.1, called HiRes, which allowed applications written for 160x160pixel Palm OS devices to make full use of the 320x320 display. In practice it works very well with most applications and can be selectively disabled for those applications which do not.

Another technology included is called JogAssist, which gives the user more control over the Palm OS by using the Jog wheel. It can be set so that when the Jog wheel's back button is held down for a few seconds, it will show a cursor over the on-screen elements and allow the user to modify them without using the stylus. Holding the back button for slightly longer instead selects the Palm OS menu from the current application, which can also be augmented with up to 3 shortcuts to regularly used tasks from: Power Off, Applications, Keyboard, Calc, Find, Backlight or Brightness.

For a device with all these features as this price point (£149 GBP, $199 US), the PEG-SJ22 proved to be a popular device. It was the cheapest color CLIÉ available and replaced the last greyscale CLIÉ, the Sony CLIÉ PEG-SL10.

External links
SJ22 Review at about.com
SJ22 Review at PalmInfoCenter

SJ22